Jaish ul-Adl, or Jaish al-Adl, is a Salafi Islamist militant organization that operates mainly in southeastern Iran, where there is a substantial concentration of Sunni Baluchis and a porous border with Pakistan. The group is responsible for several attacks against civilians and military personnel in Iran. The group claims that it is a separatist group fighting for independence of Sistan and Baluchistan Province and greater rights for Baluch people. Iran believes that the group is linked to Al-Qaeda. The group also maintain ties with Ansar Al-Furqan which is another Iranian Baloch Sunni armed group operating in Iran. Salahuddin Farooqui is the current head of Jaish ul-Adl. His brother, Amir Naroui, was killed by Taliban in Afghanistan.

The group was founded in 2012 by members of Jundallah, a Sunni extremist militant group that had been weakened following Iran's capture and execution of its leader, Abdolmalek Rigi, in 2010. Its first major attack occurred in October 2013. Jaish ul-Adl is a designated terrorist organization by Iran, Japan, New Zealand and the United States.

Iranian state media has alleged that Saudi Arabia and the United States are key backers of the group.

Attacks
On 25 August 2012, 10 members of the IRGC were killed in an attack.

On 25 October 2013, the group claimed responsibility for killing 14 Iranian border guards in the city of Saravan. The group claimed that the attack was in retaliation of 16 Iranian Baloch prisoners who were on death row. The prisoners were convicted of drug trafficking and extremism. As result of the attack, Iranian officials hanged 16 prisoners on 26 October 2013.

On October 9, 2014, Iran's state news agency reported that three members of Iranian security forces were killed by Jaish ul-Adl. According to the news agency, the militants had called the police emergency line and once the members of security forces reached the area, they were attacked by militants belong to Jaish ul-Adl. Previously, one Iranian soldier was killed and two pro-government militiamen were wounded in an attack that was blamed on Jaish ul-Adl.

In April 2015, eight Iranian border guards were killed in a cross-border attack from Pakistan.

On April 26, 2017, the group claimed responsibility for an ambush that killed at least nine Iranian border guards and injured two others. The Iranian border guards were patrolling the Pakistan–Iran border when they were attacked.

In December 2018, the group took responsibility for a suicide bombing in the port city of Chabahar, killing two police officers and wounded forty-two others.

On 29 January 2019, the group took responsibility for a double bombing in Zahedan which wounded three police officers.

On 2 February 2019, Jaish Al-Adl claimed responsibility for the attack on Basij paramilitary base in south eastern Iran according to Tasnim News Agency. The attack left one paramilitary soldier dead and wounded five other.

On February 13, 2019, a suicide bombing in Iran targeting a bus carrying IRGC personnel killed 27 people.

Losses
On 29 September 2018, Iranian authorities announced that they have killed four and injured two fighters belonging to Jaish Al-Adl in an ambush in Saravan. According to the authorities, the dead included group's second-in-command, Hashem Nokri.

On 26 December 2020, Iranian authorities hanged Abdulhamid Mir Baluchzehi on charges of killing two Iranian Revolutionary Guards in 2015. According to Iranian authorities, Mir Baluchzehi was a principal member of Jaish ul-Adl.

On 3 January 2021, Hassan Dehvari and Elias Qalandarzehi were hanged by Iranian authorities on charges of abduction, bombing, murder of security forces and civilians, and of working with the extremist Jaish al-Adl. The pair were arrested by Iranian authorities in April 2014.

On 30 January 2021, Iran hanged Javid Dehghan, the former leader of Jaish ul-Adl, for the murder of two Islamic Revolutionary Guard Corps (IRGC) members in Sistan and Baluchestan Province.

On 10 August 2021, Tasnim News Agency reported that a clash took place between Taliban and Jaish ul-Adl in Afghanistan. Amir Naroui along with a leader of the Taher Shahouzi group and five Taliban fighters were killed in the clash. Amir Naroui was a prominent leader of Jaish ul-Adl and the brother of Salahuddin Farooqui.

References

Baloch nationalist militant groups
Jihadist groups in Pakistan
Militant opposition to the Islamic Republic of Iran
Organisations designated as terrorist by Iran
Organisations designated as terrorist by Japan
Organizations designated as terrorist by the United States
Organisations designated as terrorist by New Zealand
Organizations based in Asia designated as terrorist
Sunni Islamist groups
Salafi Islamist groups